The Hero of My Dreams is a 1960 West German romantic comedy film directed by Arthur Maria Rabenalt and starring Carlos Thompson, Heidi Brühl and Peter Vogel.

It was shot at the Bavaria Studios in Munich. The film's sets were designed by the art directors Max Mellin and Karl Weber.

Cast
 Carlos Thompson as Robert Moutier
 Heidi Brühl as Marianne Kleinschmidt
 Peter Vogel as Oliver Martens
 Maria Perschy as Franziska Kleinschmidt
 Margitta Scherr as Petra Martens
 Klaus Dahlen as Bernhard Kleinschmidt
 Marte Harell as Frau Martens
 Edith Mill as Frau Kleinschmidt
 Lucie Englisch as Huberbäuerin
 Hans Zesch-Ballot as Günther Martens
  as Hugo Kleinschmidt
 Franz Fröhlich as Huberbauer
 Ernst Brasch
 Bum Krüger

See also
 Happy Days (France, 1941)
 Happy Days (Italy, 1942)

References

Bibliography
 Bock, Hans-Michael & Bergfelder, Tim. The Concise CineGraph. Encyclopedia of German Cinema. Berghahn Books, 2009.

External links 
 

1960 films
1960 romantic comedy films
German romantic comedy films
West German films
1960s German-language films
Films directed by Arthur Maria Rabenalt
Films about vacationing
German films based on plays
Remakes of French films
Bavaria Film films
Films shot at Bavaria Studios
1960s German films